Daniel (Dan) Callaghan (1786–1849) was a prominent businessman and Irish politician who served as MP for Cork City from 1830 to 1849 (1830-1832 as a member of the Whig Party; 1832-1849 as a member of the Irish Repeal Association). As a member of the Repeal Association, Dan Callaghan sought to end the Act of Union (1800), which created the United Kingdom of Great Britain and Ireland. Callaghan, along with other Irish MP's like Daniel O' Connell, opposed the introduction of the Poor Laws (Ireland), which established the Victorian workhouses to Ireland.

Daniel Callaghan was brother of Gerard Callaghan, who served as an MP for Cork City  1829-1832 as a member of the Tory Party, and the grandfather of Admiral George Callaghan.

References 

1786 births
1849 deaths
Members of the Parliament of the United Kingdom for Cork City
UK MPs 1830–1831
UK MPs 1831–1832
UK MPs 1832–1835
UK MPs 1835–1837
UK MPs 1837–1841
UK MPs 1841–1847
Irish Repeal Association MPs